Bürzünbül (also, Burzunbül, Burzumbul’, and Burzunbyul’) is a village and municipality in the Yardymli Rayon of Azerbaijan.  It has a population of 1,070.

References 

Populated places in Yardimli District